The Onge (also Önge, Ongee, and Öñge) are an Andamanese ethnic group, indigenous to the Andaman Islands in Southeast Asia at the Bay of Bengal, currently administered by India. They are traditionally hunter-gatherers and fishers, but also practice plant cultivation. They are designated as a Scheduled Tribe of India.

History 

In the 18th century the Onge, or Madhumitha, were distributed across Little Andaman Island and the nearby islands, with some territory and camps established on Rutland Island and the southern tip of South Andaman Island. After they encountered British colonial officers, friendly relations were established with the British Empire in the 1800s through Lieutenant Archibald Blair. British naval officer M. V. Portman described them as the "mildest, most timid, and inoffensive" group of Andamanese people he had encountered. By the end of the 19th century they sometimes visited the South and North Brother Islands to catch sea turtles; at the time, those islands seemed to be the boundary between their territory and the range of the Great Andamanese people further north. Today, the surviving members are confined to two reserve camps on Little Andaman: Dugong Creek in the northeast, and South Bay.

Population 
Onge population numbers were substantially reduced in the aftermath of colonisation and settlement, from 672 in 1901 to barely 100. The population is still maintaining their cultural and biological identity, and it appears that total numbers have increased from 100 to 117 in 2017.   

A major cause of the decline in Onge population is the changes in their food habits brought about by their contact with the outside world. Infant and child mortality is in the range of 40%. The Onge's net reproductive index is 0.91. The net reproductive index among the Great Andamanese is 1.40.

In 1901, there were 672 Onge; 631 in 1911, 346 in 1921, 250 in 1931, and 150 in 1951.

Tsunami surviving tactics 
The semi-nomadic Onge have traditional stories that tells of the ground shaking and a great wall of water destroying the land. Taking heed of this story, the Onge survived the tsunami catastrophe caused by the 2004 Indian Ocean earthquake by taking shelter in the highlands.

Poisoning incident 
In December 2008, eight male tribal members died after drinking a toxic liquididentified as methanol by some sourcesthat they had apparently mistaken for drinking alcohol. The liquid apparently came from a container that had washed ashore at Dugong Creek near their settlement on the island, but Port Blair authorities ordered an investigation into whether it had originated elsewhere. A further 15 Onge were taken to hospital with at least one critically ill.

With their population estimated at only around 100 before the incident, the director of Survival International described the mass poisoning as a "calamity for the Onge", and warned that any more deaths could "put the survival of the entire tribe in serious danger". Bhopinder Singh, the Lieutenant Governor of the Andaman Islands, ordered an inquiry into the incident.

Culture and religion 
The native Andamanese religion and belief system is a form of Animism. Ancestor worship is an important element in the religious traditions of the Andaman islands. The Andamanese probably had no government or clan leader, but made decisions by group consensus.

Language 
The Onge speak the Önge language. It is one of two known Ongan languages (southern Andamanese languages). Önge used to be spoken throughout Little Andaman as well as in smaller islands to the north, and possibly in the southern tip of South Andaman island. Since the middle of the 19th century, with the arrival of the British in the Andamans, and, after Indian independence, the massive inflow of Indian settlers from the mainland, the number of Onge speakers has steadily declined. However, a moderate increase has been observed in recent years. , there were 94 native Onge speakers confined to a single settlement in the northeast of Little Andaman Island (see map above), making it an endangered language.

The Ongan languages, to which Onge belongs, have been proposed by Juliette Blevins to be related to Mainland Asian languages, such as Austronesian. However, this proposal has not been well received by other linguists, such as Robert Blust, who concludes that the hypothesis is not supported by the comparative method (used in linguistics), and also cites non-linguistic (such as cultural, archaeological, and biological) evidence against Blevins' hypothesis. and George van Driem (2011), who considers Blevins' evidence as "not compelling", although he leaves the possibility open that some resemblances could be the result of contact/borrowing, a position also held by Hoogervorst (2012).

Genetics 

Genetically, the Onge, as well as other Andamanese people, are distantly related to East Asian people. The Andamanese Onge show the highest affinity towards some Southeast Asian Negrito ethnic groups, such as the Aeta people, but also ancient remains of Hoabinhians, which are all characterized by Basal-East Asian ancestry. It was found that Andamanese (Onge) split from the common ancestor of modern day East Asians between 50,000BC to 25,000BC, before becoming isolated on the Andaman Islands. The Andamanese (Onge) as well as East Asians, are also distantly related to the Indigenous population of South Asia. Recent genetic evidence suggest that a Basal-East Asian population (close or ancestral to Andamanese and East Asians) was widespread in Asia and contributed to the formation of modern South Asians (Indian people).

A study by Reich et al. (2009) found that while the Onge are distantly related to modern Indian people, they have none of the admixture from Neolithic Iranian farmers or steppe pastoralists which is widespread on the mainland. From this, they conclude that the Onge are solely descended from one of the ancient populations which contributed to the genetics of modern Indians. According to Chaubey and Endicott (2013), overall, the Andamanese are more closely related to Southeast Asians and East Asians than they are to present-day South Asians. according to Yelmen et al. 2019, certain South Indian tribal groups are a better proxy for Ancient Ancestral South Asian (AASI) ancestry than the Andamanese Onge are.

Analysis of paternal lineages indicates that all Onge carry the Y-DNA Haplogroup D, widespread in East Asia and less in Central Asia. Maternally, the Onge also exclusively belong to the M clade, bearing the M2 and M4 subclades, commonly found in Asia.

References 

Indigenous peoples of South Asia
Ethnic groups in the Andaman and Nicobar Islands
Scheduled Tribes of the Andaman and Nicobar Islands